Elections were held in Prescott and Russell United Counties, Ontario on October 22, 2018 in conjunction with municipal elections across the province.

Prescott and Russell United Counties Council
The Council consists of the mayors of the eight constituent municipalities:

Alfred and Plantagenet

Casselman

Champlain

Clarence-Rockland

East Hawkesbury

Hawkesbury

Russell

Councillors

There are 4 seats being contested for Russell Town Council.

The Nation

References

Prescott
United Counties of Prescott and Russell